The European Journal of Cancer Care is a bimonthly peer-reviewed medical journal covering research on cancer care. The editor-in-chief is David Weller (University of Edinburgh). The journal was established in 1992 and is published by Wiley-Blackwell.

Abstracting and indexing
The journal is abstracted and indexed in:
EBSCO databases
ProQuet databases
Current Contents/Clinical Medicine
InfoTrac
PsycINFO
Scopus
MEDLINE/PubMed
Science Citation Index Expanded
According to the Journal Citation Reports, the journal has a 2017 impact factor of 2.409.

See also
European Journal of Cancer

References

External links

Wiley-Blackwell academic journals
Oncology journals
English-language journals
Publications established in 1992
Bimonthly journals